Pezzo may refer to:

 Pezzo, in music a synonym of composition
 Paola Pezzo, a cross-country mountain bike racer from Verona, Italy
 Punta Pezzo, a point in Reggio Calabria, southern Italy
 Pezzo capriccioso, composition of Pyotr Ilyich Tchaikovsky

See also 

 Del Pezzo (disambiguation)